Abelove is a surname. Notable people with the surname include:

Henry D. Abelove (born 1945), American academic and literary scholar
Joan Abelove (born 1945), American author